Ilm Al-Iqtisad (The Subject of Economics) was a book written by Muhammad Iqbal, the great poet-philosopher of the Indian subcontinent. It was published in 1903.

See also 
 Index of Muhammad Iqbal–related articles

External links 
Introduction at Iqbal Academy site

Books by Muhammad Iqbal
Economics books